Rahul Kohli (born 13 November 1985) is an English actor. He is best known for his television roles as Dr. Ravi Chakrabarti in iZombie (2015–19), Owen Sharma in The Haunting of Bly Manor (2020), and Sheriff Hassan in Midnight Mass (2021).

Early life
Kohli was born in London on 13 November 1985, the son of Indian Hindu immigrant parents. His mother was raised in Thailand, while his father spent his early years in Kenya. Two of his grandparents were born in the future Pakistani part of British India.

Career
Kohli was cast in a lead role in the television series iZombie (2015–19) as Dr. Ravi Chakrabarti. He appeared in all 71 episodes of the show. Other notable credits include the 2018 film Happy Anniversary, the TV series Supergirl (2017–19), and the animated series Harley Quinn (2019–20). Kohli starred as Owen Sharma in The Haunting of Bly Manor, a Netflix horror drama series by Mike Flanagan released in October 2020. He went on to star in Midnight Mass, a supernatural horror  miniseries also created by Flanagan, in the role of Sheriff Hassan Shabazz. The series was released in September 2021.

Personal life
In July 2018, Kohli announced his engagement to his now ex-girlfriend Yasmin Molloy.

Outside of acting, Kohli is known for his heavy use of Twitter, his support for football team Liverpool FC, and being an avid gamer.

Kohli uses both he/him and they/them pronouns, which he began doing after reading a guide from GLAAD about how to be an ally to transgender people. He has clarified that he does this despite being cisgender and not non-binary because he wants to "normalise 'they/them' pronouns in general".

Filmography

Film

Television

Video games

Notes

References

External links
 
 

1985 births
21st-century English male actors
British male actors of Indian descent
English male film actors
English male stage actors
English male television actors
English male voice actors
English people of Indian descent
Living people